This is a list of the members of the Australian House of Representatives in the Fifth Australian Parliament, which was elected on 31 May 1913.

Notes

* These candidates were elected unopposed.
† These seats were created at the 1912 redistribution.

  Alfred Conroy was first elected as the member for Werriwa in 1901, but was defeated in 1906.
  Charlie Frazer died in 1913, and was replaced by Hugh Mahon (Labor) at the resulting by-election on 22 December 1913.
  Chester Manifold was first elected as the member for Corangamite in 1901, but he retired in 1903.
  Ernest Roberts died in 1913, and was replaced by George Edwin Yates (Labor) at the resulting by-election on 10 January 1914.

Members of Australian parliaments by term
20th-century Australian politicians